Kenneth Mathew Sebastian (born 31 December 1990) is an Indian stand-up comedian, musician and filmmaker. He first rose to prominence through a YouTube channel that broadcasts clips of his stand-up shows, devotional song covers, in addition to original skits, garnering 152 million views since 2008. He has toured the United States, Singapore, The United Arab Emirates and Australia. In 2017, he produced an hour-long comedy special for Amazon Prime. He performs primarily in English, switching to Hindi for comic effect. He was also a judge in Comicstaan, a comedy reality show. He released his special The Most Interesting Person In The Room on Netflix in 2020.

Early life and education
Kenny Sebastian was born on 31 December 1990 to Catholic parents from Pala, Kerala, and was brought up in Bangalore. His father was in the Navy, hence Sebastian migrated throughout his childhood. He speaks English, Hindi, Kannada and Malayalam. Sebastian went to Kendriya Vidyalaya N.A.L. for his education. He holds a degree in Visual Arts from the Karnataka Chitrakala Parishath. Kenny married his longtime partner, Tracy Alison in Goa on 16 January 2022.

Career
Kenny made songs from tweets, popularly known as #KennySing4Me. This gained him his initial popularity. He also created an improvised sketch show for Comedy Central known as The Living Room. He co-wrote and acted in the web series called Star Boyz. He did a cameo in the web series Humorously Yours, in Better Life Foundation by Naveen Richard and in Pushpavalli by Sumukhi Suresh. He also has an original series Die Trying, an improvised show The Improvisers: Something From Nothing along with Abish Mathew, Kanan Gill and Kaneez Surka and a sketch comedy show Sketchy Behaviour co-written and co-starring Kanan Gill on Amazon Prime Video.He also started his mini series named "Getting there" which has 3 episodes and two stand-up specials each on Amazon Prime and Netflix.

He is a judge for Comicstaan, a comedy hunt reality show on Amazon Prime Video.

His podcast titled Simple Ken, which has featured various guests, has also gained popularity on audio streaming services and on YouTube. However, Kenny has stated time and again on the podcast that he would like the 'SimpleKen' community to remain small, as it was meant to be a personal, niche venture, and not mainstream.

He has his own production house named SuperHuman Studioz and has also edited a Bollywood film "Station" at the age of 21. He also did subtitling work for about a month, before he quit abruptly.

Filmography

Discography

References

External links
 

Indian stand-up comedians
Living people
1991 births
Indian YouTubers